Attila László Hadnagy (born 8 September 1980) is a Romanian former footballer who played as a forward and serves as the general director of Liga I club Sepsi OSK.

Career

Oltul Sfântu Gheorghe
Hadnagy started his career at hometown club Oltul Sfântu Gheorghe. At the end of his fifth Divizia C season at the team, they managed to win the league and got promoted to Divizia B. However they were relegated after only one year.

Petrolul Ploiești
Hadnagy spent the following three seasons at Divizia B side Petrolul Ploiești.

Brașov
In the summer of 2007, he joined the more ambitious Liga II side FC Brașov managed by Răzvan Lucescu and captained by Róbert Ilyés. They won the 2007–2008 Liga II which meant promotion to Liga I and he also became the top scorer of Liga II that season. He played in Liga I for the club until the winter break of the 2012–2013 season when he left for Liga II side Botoșani.

Botoșani
At Botoșani he managed to win his second Liga II title at the end of the 2012–2013 season. He stayed with the club for the following three Liga I seasons before accepting an offer from yet another Liga II side.

Sepsi OSK
In the summer of 2016 he joined Sepsi OSK, his hometown's recently founded team. He also became team captain. With his 28 goals in 31 games he played a vital role in obtaining promotion to Liga I at the end of the 2016–17 season. He played 2 more Liga I seasons for the team before retiring at the age of 38 in 2019.

Personal life
Born in Sfântu Gheorghe, Hadnagy is of Hungarian ethnicity.

Career statistics

Club

Honours
Oltul Sfântu Gheorghe
Divizia C: 2002–2003

Brașov
Liga II: 2007–08

Botoșani
Liga II: 2012–13

Individual
Liga II top scorer: 2007–08 (24 goals)

References

External links
 
 
 
 

1980 births
Living people
People from Sfântu Gheorghe
Romanian sportspeople of Hungarian descent
Romanian footballers
Association football forwards
Liga I players
Liga II players
FC Petrolul Ploiești players
FC Brașov (1936) players
FC Botoșani players
Sepsi OSK Sfântu Gheorghe players